Minuscule 462 (in the Gregory-Aland numbering), α 359 (in the Soden numbering), is a Greek minuscule manuscript of the New Testament, on a paper. Palaeographically it has been assigned to the 13th century. 
Formerly it was labelled by 101a and 116p.
It was adapted for liturgical use.

Description 

The codex contains the text of the Acts of the Apostles, Catholic epistles, and Pauline epistles on 240 paper leaves. It is carefully written in one column per page, 25 lines per page.

It contains prolegomena, Synaxarion, and scholia to the Acts, and lectionary markings at the margin of the Epistles for liturgical reading.
It contains Martyrium Pauli.

The order of books: Acts of the Apostles, Catholic epistles, and Pauline epistles.

Kurt Aland did not place the Greek text of the codex in any Category.

According to the subscription at the end of the Epistle to the Romans, the Letter was written προς Ρωμαιους εγραφη απο Κορινθου δια Φοιβης της διακονου; the same subscription have manuscripts: 42, 90, 216, 339, 466, 642;

History 
It is dated by the INTF to the 13th century.

Formerly it was labelled by 101a and 116p. In 1908 Gregory gave the number 462 to it.

The manuscript was examined by Matthaei and Treu. It is currently housed at the State Historical Museum (V. 24, S. 346) in Moscow.

See also 

 List of New Testament minuscules
 Biblical manuscript
 Textual criticism
 Minuscule 461
 Minuscule 464

References

Further reading 

 C. F. Matthaei, Novum Testamentum Graece et Latine (Riga, 1782-1788).
 Kurt Treu, Die griechischen Handschriften des Neuen Testaments in der UdSSR; eine systematische Auswertung des Texthandschriften in Leningrad, Moskau, Kiev, Odessa, Tbiblisi und Erevan, Texte und Untersuchungen 91 (Berlin, 1966), pp. 254-258.

External links 
 

Greek New Testament minuscules
13th-century biblical manuscripts